Burjan is a village in the Mirpur Tehsil of Mirpur District, Azad Kashmir, Pakistan.

Demography 
According to the 1998 census, its population was 970.

History 

Like many villages in the Mirpur region, many of its residents have emigrated to the United Kingdom.

References 

Populated places in Mirpur District